Agincourt may refer to:

 Battle of Agincourt, a major English victory in the Hundred Years' War, at Azincourt, France

Places 
 Agincourt, Meurthe-et-Moselle, a commune in France
 Agincourt, Mpumalanga, a town in South Africa
 Agincourt, Toronto, a neighbourhood in Ontario, Canada
 Agincourt Collegiate Institute, a secondary school in Toronto
 Agincourt District Library, a Toronto Public Library branch
 Agincourt GO Station, a railway station in Toronto, Canada
 Agincourt Junior Public School, an elementary school in Toronto
 Agincourt Mall, a retail mall in Toronto
 CPR Toronto Yard, also known as Agincourt Yard, a railway marshalling yard in Toronto
 Scarborough—Agincourt, a federal electoral riding and city ward in Toronto
 Scarborough—Agincourt (provincial electoral district), a provincial riding in Toronto
 Agincourt House, Monmouth, a seventeenth century half-timbered building in Wales
 Agincourt Square, an open space in the centre of Monmouth, Wales
 Azincourt, the town near which the Battle of Agincourt was fought
 Pengjia Islet located north of Taiwan island in Zhongzheng, Keelung, Taiwan; also known as Agincourt

Books 
 Agincourt, an 1844 book by George Payne Rainsford James
 Agincourt: Henry V and the Battle That Made England, a 2005 book by Juliet Barker
 Azincourt (novel), a 2008 book by Bernard Cornwell

Other uses 
 Agincourt (band), a 1960s English psychedelic folk band
 Agincourt (game), a 1979 board wargame
 "Agincourt Carol", an English folk song 
 The Empress of Agincourt, an RSD-17 locomotive of the Canadian Pacific Railway
 HMS Agincourt, several ships of the Royal Navy
 , several merchant ships

See also 
 Agencourt, a commune in Côte-d'Or, France
 Azincourt, a commune in Pas-de-Calais, France